The Kinematograph is a 2009 Polish animated short film.

Plot
An elderly man named Francis is in the process of designing a movie projector.  His wife Elizabeth wonders how much she can continue to support him in this endeavor.

External links
 

Polish animated short films
2009 animated films
2009 films
2000s English-language films